The Greenwich Tea Party was an incident that took place on December 22, 1774, early in the American Revolution, in Greenwich, a small community in Cumberland County, New Jersey, on the Cohansey River. That night, a load of tea meant to be sent overland into Philadelphia was torched by a group of 40 Patriots dressed as Native Americans. The event took place a year after the Boston Tea Party.

One participant of the Greenwich Tea Party was Richard Howell, who would become the third governor of the state of New Jersey and whose granddaughter, Varina Howell, would marry Jefferson Davis, president of the Confederacy.

In 1908, the Cumberland County Historical Society erected a monument to mark the event, which is located at Main Street at Market Square in Greenwich Township. On September 27 and 28, 2008, there was a weekend celebration of the 100th anniversary of the monument.

References

External links 
 The Burning of the Tea at Cohansey
 The Last Tea Party
 100th Anniversary of the Monument Celebration
 The O.J. Hammell Co., builders of the Tea Burning monument

 Greenwich Township, Cumberland County, New Jersey
 New Jersey in the American Revolution
1774 in the Thirteen Colonies